The following is an incomplete list of colleges and universities in Cuba:

Provincial Colleges 

 Agrarian University of Havana "Fructuoso Rodríguez", Mayabeque (UNAH) 
 Central University of Las Villas, Santa Clara (UCLV) 
 University of Artemisa (UA) 
 University of Camagüey "Ignacio Agramonte Loynaz" (UC) 
 University of Ciego de Ávila "Máximo Gómez Báez" (UNICA) 
 University of Cienfuegos "Carlos Rafael Rodríguez" (UCF) 
 University of Granma (campuses in Bayamo and Manzanillo) (UDG) 
 University of Guantánamo (CUG) 
 University of Havana (UH) 
 University of Holguín "Oscar Lucero Moya" (UHO) 
 University of Las Tunas "Vladimir Ilich Lenin" (ULT) 
 University of Matanzas "Camilo Cienfuegos" (UMCC) 
 University of Pinar del Rio "Hnos Saíz Montes de Oca" (UPR) 
 University of Sancti Spirítus "José Martí Pérez" (UNISS) 
 University of Santiago de Cuba (Universidad de Oriente) (UO) 
 University of Isla de la Juventud "Jesús Montané Oropesa" (UIJ)

Specialized Colleges 

 University of Information Science (UCI) 
 Polytechnic Institute "Jose Antonio Echevarria", Havana (commonly known as CUJAE) 
 Instituto Superior de Arte, Havana (ISA)

International Colleges 

 Escuela Internacional de Educación Fisica y Deportes, Havana (EIEFD) 
 Escuela Latinoamericana de Medicina, Havana (ELAM) 
 Escuela Internacional de Cine y Televisión, San Antonio de los Baños (EICTV)

Higher Institutes 

 Instituto Superior de Tecnologías y Ciencias Aplicadas, Havana (INSTEC)  
 Instituto Superior de Diseño, Havana (ISDi) 
 Instituto Superior Minero Metalúrgico Dr. Antonio Núñez Jiménez, Moa (ISMMM)  
 Instituto Superior de Relaciones Internacionales "Dr. Raúl Roa García", Havana (ISRI) 
 Instituto Técnico Militar "José Martí", Havana (ITM)

Medical Colleges 

 Universidad de Ciencias Médicas de Pinar del Río "Dr. Ernesto Guevara de la Serna" (UCMPR)
 Universidad de Ciencias Médicas de Artemisa (UCMA)
 Universidad de Ciencias Médicas de La Habana "Victoria de Girón" (UCMH)
 Universidad de Ciencias Médicas de Mayabeque, San José de las Lajas (UCMMY)
 Universidad de Ciencias Médicas de Matanzas (UCMMT)
 Universidad de Ciencias Médicas de Villa Clara "Dr. Serafín Ruíz de Zárate Ruíz", Santa Clara (UCMVC)
 Universidad de Ciencias Médicas de Cienfuegos "Dr. Raúl Dorticós Torrado" (UCMCFG)
 Universidad de Ciencias Médicas de Sancti Spiritus "Dr. Faustino Pérez Hernández" (UCMSS)
 Universidad de Ciencias Médicas de Ciego de Ávila "Dr. José Assef Yara" (UCMCAV)
 Universidad de Ciencias Médicas de Camagüey "Dr. Carlos Juan Finlay" (UCMPR)
 Universidad de Ciencias Médicas de Las Tunas "Dr. Zoilo Marinello Vidaurreta" (UCMLT)
 Universidad de Ciencias Médicas de Holguín "Mariana Grajales Coello" (UCMHo)
 Universidad de Ciencias Médicas de Granma "Celia Sánchez Manduley", Bayamo (UCMGRM)
 Universidad de Ciencias Médicas de Santiago de Cuba (UCMSC)
 Universidad de Ciencias Médicas de Guantánamo (UCMG)
 Universidad de Ciencias Médicas de Isla de la Juventud (UCMIJ)

See also

 Education in Cuba

References

External links 

 Universities in Cuba by region

 
 01
Universities
Cuba
Cuba